Fernando Gómez Esparza (born 21 August 1953) is a Mexican politician affiliated with the Institutional Revolutionary Party. He served as Senator of the LVIII and LIX Legislatures of the Mexican Congress representing Aguascalientes and as Deputy of the 47 Legislature.

He earned his bachelor's degree in economics from the National Autonomous University of Mexico, which he later taught at in addition to the Autonomous University of Aguascalientes.

See also
 List of mayors of Aguascalientes

References

1953 births
Living people
People from Aguascalientes City
Members of the Senate of the Republic (Mexico)
Members of the Chamber of Deputies (Mexico)
Institutional Revolutionary Party politicians
21st-century Mexican politicians
Politicians from Aguascalientes
National Autonomous University of Mexico alumni
Academic staff of the National Autonomous University of Mexico
Academic staff of the Autonomous University of Aguascalientes
20th-century Mexican politicians
Municipal presidents of Aguascalientes